The activity selection problem  is a combinatorial optimization problem concerning the selection of non-conflicting activities to perform within a given time frame, given a set of activities each marked by a start time (si) and finish time (fi). The problem is to select the maximum number of activities that can be performed by a single person or machine, assuming that a person can only work on a single activity at a time. The activity selection problem is also known as the Interval scheduling maximization problem (ISMP), which is a special type of the more general Interval Scheduling problem.

A classic application of this problem is in scheduling a room for multiple competing events, each having its own time requirements (start and end time), and many more arise within the framework of operations research.

Formal definition
Assume there exist n activities with each of them being represented by a start time si and finish time fi. Two activities i and j are said to be non-conflicting if si ≥ fj or sj ≥ fi. The activity selection problem consists in finding the maximal solution set (S) of non-conflicting activities, or more precisely there must exist no solution set S' such that |S'| > |S| in the case that multiple maximal solutions have equal sizes.

Optimal solution
The activity selection problem is notable in that using a greedy algorithm to find a solution will always result in an optimal solution. A pseudocode sketch of the iterative version of the algorithm and a proof of the optimality of its result are included below.

Algorithm

Greedy-Iterative-Activity-Selector(A, s, f): 

    Sort A by finish times stored in f
    S = {A[1]} 
    k = 1
    
    n = A.length
    
    for i = 2 to n:
        if s[i] ≥ f[k]: 
            S = S U {A[i]}
            k = i
    
    return S

Explanation 

Line 1: This    algorithm is called Greedy-Iterative-Activity-Selector, because it is first of all a greedy algorithm, and then it is iterative. There's also a recursive version of this greedy algorithm.
 is an array containing the activities. 

Note that these arrays are indexed starting from 1 up to the length of the corresponding array.

Line 3: Sorts in increasing order of finish times the array of activities  by using the finish times stored in the array . This operation can be done in  time, using for example merge sort, heap sort, or quick sort algorithms.

Line 4: Creates a set  to store the selected activities, and initialises it with the activity  that has the earliest finish time.

Line 5: Creates a variable  that keeps track of the index of the last selected activity.

Line 9: Starts iterating from the second element of that array  up to its last element.

Line 12: The index of the last selected activity is updated to the just added activity .

Proof of optimality
Let  be the set of activities ordered by finish time. We will show that , which begins with the greedy choice (activity 1), is another optimal solution. Since , and the activities in A are disjoint by definition, the activities in B are also disjoint. Since B has the same number of activities as A, that is, B is also optimal.

Once the greedy choice is made, the problem reduces to finding an optimal solution for the subproblem. If A is an optimal solution to the original problem S containing the greedy choice, then  is an optimal solution to the activity-selection problem .

Why? If this were not the case, pick a solution B′ to S′ with more activities than A′ containing the greedy choice for S′.  Then, adding 1 to B′ would yield a feasible solution B to S with more activities than A, contradicting the optimality.

Weighted activity selection problem
The generalized version of the activity selection problem involves selecting an optimal set of non-overlapping activities such that the total weight is maximized. Unlike the unweighted version, there is no greedy solution to the weighted activity selection problem. However, a dynamic programming solution can readily be formed using the following approach:

Consider an optimal solution containing activity . We can recursively find solutions for these two sets because of optimal sub-structure. As we don't know , we can try each of the activities. This approach leads to an  solution. This yields an  solution. This can be further optimized considering the fact that we do not need to consider all ranges  but instead just . The following algorithm thus yields an  solution:

Weighted-Activity-Selection(S):  // S = list of activities

    sort S by finish time
    opt[0] = 0  // opt[j] represents optimal solution (sum of weights of selected activities) for S[1,2..,j]
   
    for i = 1 to n:
        t = binary search to find activity with finish time <= start time for i
            // if there are more than one such activities, choose the one with last finish time
        opt[i] = MAX(opt[i-1], opt[t] + w(i))
        
    return opt[n]

References

External links
 Activity Selection Problem

Optimal scheduling
Articles containing proofs